KQBN-LP, UHF analog channel 28, was a low-powered Azteca America-affiliated television station licensed to Prescott, Arizona, United States. The station was owned by Una Vez Más Holdings, LLC. The station's transmitter was located in the Bradshaw Mountains.

History
An original construction permit for a low-power television station was granted on June 14, 1995, to Bruce Merrill, a pioneer in cable television service and cable television equipment manufacturing. The station was originally to broadcast as K69HL on UHF channel 69 from Mingus Mountain between Prescott Valley and Jerome, Arizona, but shortly afterward, the FCC granted the station authorization to move to UHF channel 28 with callsign K28FF, and to move the transmitter to Tower Mountain in the Bradshaw Mountains southeast of Prescott. The station licensed its modifications on December 23, 1997. In February 2000, Merrill sold the station to Tiger Eye Broadcasting Corp. of Miramar, Florida. At some point, the station went silent.

In February 2005, Tiger Eye agreed to sell K28FF to Una Vez Mas. The FCC approved the transaction in May 2005, and the sale was consummated in April 2006. The FCC granted Tiger Eye a construction permit in June 2005 to move the station's transmitter location to the White Tank Mountains to the northwest of Phoenix to serve the rapidly growing Northwest Valley cities, but the facilities were never built. Una Vez Mas changed the stations call letters to KQBN-LP in November 2005, and in October 2006, KQBN-LP moved to a new transmitter site in the Bradshaw Mountains not far from the original licensed site and returned to air, rebroadcasting KNAZ-TV from Flagstaff. The station began airing Azteca América programming in early December 2006.

KQBN-LP's license was cancelled by the FCC on March 28, 2011, due to the station being silent since August 1, 2008.

KQBN call letters
The KQBN call letters had previously been on low-power stations owned by Una Vez Mas in Phoenix (channel 43) and in Tucson (channel 14).

References

External links
 Tiger Eye Broadcasting Corp.
 

Prescott, Arizona
QBN-LP (defunct)
Television channels and stations established in 1995
QBN-LP (defunct)
Defunct television stations in the United States
Television channels and stations disestablished in 2011
1995 establishments in Arizona
2011 disestablishments in Arizona
QBN-LP (defunct)